The  is a museum of Buddhist art and history in Kyōto, Japan. Conceived as part of the 370th anniversary celebrations of the foundation of what is now Ryūkoku University, it opened facing Nishi Hongan-ji in 2011. The museum displays works from its "vast" collection and there is also a digital recreation of the corridor of Cave 15 at Bezeklik. The façade has four thousand ceramic louvers, intended to give a feeling of traditional Kyōto while also helping regulate light and temperature within.

See also
 List of National Treasures of Japan (writings: Japanese books)
 Kyoto National Museum
 Nishi Hongan-ji

References

External links

 Ryukoku Museum

Museums in Kyoto
Museums established in 2011
2011 establishments in Japan
University museums in Japan